Alfonso, King of Castile is a historical tragedy by the English writer Matthew Lewis. It was published in November 1801, and was first staged at the Theatre Royal, Covent Garden the following year. It is set during the reign of Alfonso XI of Castile during the fourteenth century.

The original Covent Garden cast included Charles Murray as Alfonso, George Frederick Cooke as Orsino, Henry Johnston as Caesario, John Waddy as Father Brazil, Nannette Johnston as Amelrosa and Harriett Litchfield as Otillia.

References

1802 plays
West End plays
Cultural depictions of Spanish kings
Tragedy plays
Plays by Matthew Lewis
Plays set in Spain
Plays set in the 14th century